Sclater's shrew (Sorex sclateri) is a species of mammal in the family Soricidae. It is endemic to Mexico.

Sclater's shrew is known only from two locations in Chiapas, the type locality in Tumbala at  elevation, and from one other location near the border with Guatemala. The area of the type locality is only 7 km2, considering the habitat availability. Its habitat is montane cloud forest.

References

Sources
 

Sorex
Endemic mammals of Mexico
Chiapas montane forests
Taxonomy articles created by Polbot
Mammals described in 1897